Antiochia in Pisidia is an archepiscopal titular see of the Roman Catholic Church. Since 1933 it has been named after the ancient city of Antiochia in Pisidia, visited by Saint Paul on his missionary journeys (Acts 13:14).

Notes
The appointment of Angelo Giacinto Scapardini to this title on 10 September 1910, apparently in error, was promptly changed on 23 September.

References

External links 
 Entry in catholic-hierarchy.org
  Apostolische Nachfolge – Titularsitze

Titular sees in Asia